Arunqash (also Romanized as Arūnqāsh, Oroonghash, Owranqāsh, Ūranqāsh, and Urungāsh) is a village in Dodangeh-ye Sofla Rural District, Ziaabad District, Takestan County, Qazvin Province, Iran. At the 2006 census, its population was 444, in 91 families.

References 

Populated places in Takestan County